The Dashti Mosque is a historical mosque in Dashti village in the Isfahan Province, Iran. It is one of the most famous structures of the Ilkhanid era. There is no inscription in or on the mosque, on which the construction year and the architect's name has been mentioned.

See also 
 List of the historical structures in the Isfahan province

References 

Mosques in Isfahan